Escapade Music Festival is an annual electronic dance musicfestival held in Ottawa, Ontario, Canada and hosts some of the biggest names in the electronic dance music industry.

History
Escapade Music Festival made its debut in 2010 as a one day event in the Byward Market with Deadmau5 headlining it and a few hundred attendees.

In 2011, Escapade Music Festival grew in size to accommodate the growth of the festival, taking place in a large market parking space and featuring 3 Major headlining DJs, Tiesto, Laidback Luke and Calvin Harris (estimated 5,000 in attendance).

In 2012, Escapade grew exponentially in size and scale to accommodate an estimated 15,000 people over 2 days (June 30 – July 1) at the Ottawa Baseball Stadium in East Ottawa, with 40+ DJs performing over 3 stages. Headliners included: Avicii, Afrojack, Excision, Aly & Fila, Project 46, Overwerk, Alesso, Tommy Trash, Dada Life, Marcus Schossow, 
Kill The Noise, Dillon Francis and Zeds Dead (Note: Chuckie could not make his flight on time to perform his set and ended up not performing).

After the 2012 event was complete, Nicholas Guindon-Vachon, one of the founders of the festival, absconded with approximately $600,000 in ticket sales revenue. Guindon-Vachon paid $40,000 for a private charter to fly him to Aruba, where he was tracked down by authorities. Guindon-Vachon was sentenced to 1 year probation, and must pay back former partners $300,000.

In 2013, Escapade moved to the RA Centre Grounds in Central Ottawa and expanded to host an estimated 20,000+ attendees over 3 days in 2 locations (June 29 – June 30, 
RA Centre Grounds, July 1, Downtown in the Byward Market). This new location allowed for bigger production (Fireworks being the most notable as the RA Centre borders the Rideau River, thereby providing a safer place to launch them and expanded facilities across the festival grounds). 40+ DJs performed over 2 stages at the main event, plus several more on the 3rd, Canada Day stage in the market. Headliners included: Ferry Corsten, Steve Angello, Mark Knight, Krewella, Above & Beyond, Markus Schulz, Ben Gold, 3LAU, Wolfgang Gartner, Benny Benassi, Candyland and Seven Lions (Notes: Bingo Players was to perform but because of Paul's bout with cancer, Project 46 was brought in as a last minute replacement. Hard Rock Sofa also didn't show due to Visa complications and Rusko failed to show due to illness, thereby allowing Krewella to play an extended set. Umek also arrived late for his set on the Tech Stage, thereby allowing Mark Knight to play later into his already extended set). Tiesto headlined the Canada stage downtown on July 1, along with Quintino and Alvaro.

In 2014, Escapade celebrated its 5th year anniversary at the Rideau Carleton Raceway in Southeast Ottawa. 
The festival expanded in size and attendance with 30,000+ attendees and expansion to a 4-day format (June 28 - June 29, Main Festival at R.C.R, June 30, Club Series, Multiple Downtown venues, July 1, Downtown in the Byward Market). This years rendition featured 40+ DJs performing over 3 stages at the main event, plus several more on the 4th, Canada Day stage in the market. Headliners included: Main Stage: Eric Prydz, Kaskade, Dimitri Vegas & Like Mike, Fedde Le Grand, Nervo (Note: Chuckie failed to show for the 2nd time) On Day 1: "#Goldrush" stage (Trance): Andrew Rayel, Orjan Nilsen, Ben Gold, "The Deep End" stage (Deep House/Chill House): Lee Foss with Anabel Englund, The Martinez Brothers. On Day 2: "Tech Fusion Tent" stage (Tech House): Danny Tenaglia, Nicole Moudaber, "Temple of Bass" stage (Bass Music): Zeds Dead, Noisia, Zomboy (Note: Grandtheft also failed to show). Dada Life headlined the Canada stage downtown July 1, alongside Project 46 and GTA (Surprise guests Stafford Brothers showed up alongside Joe Ghost during his Canada stage set).

This year hosted a 4th extra day called the "Escapade Club Series" between the Main Festival and the Canada Day event at various Downtown Ottawa Nightclubs. Artists included Borgeous, The Stafford Brothers, Victor Calderone, Alvin Risk, Figure, and Simon Patterson.

The festival has been supported by such sponsors as: Hot 89.9 FM, Heineken, Jägermeister, Smirnoff, Smart Set, TD Bank, Casino Lac Leamy and Courtyard Marriott. Escapade Music Festival is a DNA Presents Production, a merger of two of Ottawa's biggest electronic dance music event producers, Projekt Events and A-list Entertainment, which hosted the 2010 and 2011 editions of the music festival.

In 2018, the festival hosted many big names including: Armin van Buuren, Zedd, Fetty Wap, Ty Dolla Sign, Alesso, Kaskade, Rezz, Carnage (DJ), Brohug, MAC, Quintino, Tchami, Robotaki, Sander Van Doorn, Joe Ghost, Ryan Shepherd, Markus Schulz, Zomboy, Mark Knight, Borgore and many others. The total attendance was 30,000 people over 2 days.

On the 1st of February 2018, it was announced that entrepreneur and social media mogul from Montréal, Québec, Olivier Primeau, the man behind Midway Group (Beachclub, Metro Metro Festival, Oasis Festival, among others) had made a significant investment in the Bud Light Escapade Music Festival. The amount of the investment was not disclosed publicly, nor the percentage of shares acquired by Mr. Primeau’s production company Midway Group.

See also
List of electronic music festivals

References

External links
Official Website

Music festivals established in 2010
Music festivals in Ottawa
July events
Electronic music festivals in Canada
Annual events in Ottawa